Julie A. Cassiday is an American literary scholar and Willcox B. and Harriet M. Adsit Professor of Russian at Williams College. She is known for her expertise in comparative literature. Cassiday is a former president of the Association for Slavic, East European, and Eurasian Studies.

Books
 Russian Style! Performing Gender in Putin’s Russia, forthcoming
 Russian Performances: Word, Object, Action. Co-edited with Julie A. Buckler and Boris Wolfson, University of Wisconsin Press, 2018
 The Enemy on Trial: Early Soviet Courts on Stage and Screen, Northern Illinois University Press 2000 (Russian translation, Academic Studies Press 2021)

References

External links
 Cassiday at Williams College

Living people
American literary critics
Williams College faculty
Comparative literature academics
Year of birth missing (living people)
Stanford University alumni
Grinnell College alumni
American women academics